The Northwest Conference is an athletic conference that competes in the NCAA's Division III.

Northwest Conference may also refer to:

 Northwest Conference (Iowa), a high school athletic conference
 Northwest Conference (OHSAA), an OHSAA athletic league

See also

 Northwest Athletic Conference